Mohamed Yusuf Abdulla Ahmed Hassan Al-Hardan (born 6 October 1997) is a Bahraini professional footballer who plays as a midfielder. He is currently playing for Al-Muharraq.

Club career

Al Muharraq
He started his career in his homeland with Al-Muharraq after his useful journey in Europe he came back to Al Muharraq and played fully season and muharraq reached the final cup and the top in the league until the league has suspended for COVID-19, in that season he played very well, he scored q goal in the King Cup and two goals in the league, 2 assists in the King Cup as well and 5 assists in the league.

Vejle BK
In August 2017, Mohammed joined Vejle after a successful trial with the team to be the first Bahraini player to play in a European first tier team alongside Abdulla Yusuf Helal who joined Czech side Bohemians 1905. His contract with Vejle was extended to the summer of 2020, on 15 March 2018. On 28 August 2019, it was announced that Al-Hardan was released from his contract with Vejle.

Sfântul Gheorghe (loan)
On 27 August 2018, Vejle Boldklub announced that Al-Hardan will be joining Sfântul Gheorghe on loan after returning from his national team duties.

Aiginiakos (loan)
Al-Hardan returned to Vejle at the end of 2018. But on 29 January 2019, he was loaned out again, this time to Aiginiakos in Greece.

International career
As of August 2018, he is the captain of the Bahrain national under-20 football team, and has also played for the under-23 side, and he played with the First team midfielder as option 1 for the coach, he played WAFF Championship and won the cup as the first cup for his country in football, and after few months he played Arabian Gulf Cup the 24th in Qatar and Bahrain has won as the first time in history (in which he scored a penalty in the semi-final).

International goals
Scores and results list Bahrain's goal tally first.

Honours
Vejle Boldklub
Danish 1st Division
Arabian Gulf Cup
WAFF Championship

External links

References

1997 births
Living people
Bahraini footballers
Bahraini expatriate footballers
Al-Muharraq SC players
Vejle Boldklub players
FC Sfîntul Gheorghe players
Danish 1st Division players
Moldovan Super Liga players
Football League (Greece) players
Association football midfielders
Footballers at the 2018 Asian Games
Asian Games competitors for Bahrain
Bahrain international footballers
Bahraini Premier League players
Bahrain youth international footballers